Cesare Rinaldi (12 December 1559 – 6 February 1636) was one of Bologna's most eminent poets. His verse was set to music as madrigals by Salamone Rossi and the circle of the Gonzaga Court at Mantua. He also wrote verse praising composers, such as Alessandro Striggio. During his entire life Rinaldi intertwined his work as a poet with the frequentation of painters and intellectuals: he was friend of the Carraccis and Guido Reni and close to Lavinia Fontana, Giovanni Valesio and other contemporary artists.

Biography 
Ten years younger than Marino, Rinaldi was a forerunner of the new concettist and Marinist poets, and perhaps can be best described as a poet poised between a Mannerist style and a new interest in the concetto and the image. His earliest volume of poems was published in 1588. His Lettere, published in two different editions in 1617 and 1620, were widely read. Although he did not become a member of the new Accademia dei Gelati, founded in Bologna in 1588 by Melchiorre Zoppio, and did not participate in the polemics and controversies that broke out more than two decades later over Marino's poetry, he had ties of friendship with younger Bolognese poets like Girolamo Preti and Claudio Achillini as well as with Marino. He took an interest in music (Monteverdi, for example) and in art, and acquired works for his “museo”—a relatively modest collection that was more on the order of a “Wunderkammer” than a collection primarily devoted to painting and sculpture.

Rinaldi was friend both to Ludovico and to Agostino Carracci and he often frequented the Accademia degli Incamminati. He wrote a sonnet for Agostino Carracci's funeral. As Carlo Cesare Malvasia relates, Rinaldi acquired the famous Bacchus and Ariadne from Ludovico Carracci, and his letters indicate that he acted as intermediary in acquiring pictures for various people, including Marino. In his later years, Rinaldi became a friend and patron of Guido Reni, who gave him his famous Mary Magdalen (now lost), and he wrote several poems in praise of Guido's art.

Style and legacy
Rinaldi played an important role in developing the new poetry of the seventeenth century, notable for its linguistic sophistication, extravagant conceits, and ingenious metaphors. He addressed a sonnet to Guido Reni, for example, only half mockingly requesting a portrait of his lady painted as a mountain of shining ivory in an enameled dawn, a forest of coral in her lap. Such richly bejeweled metaphors are characteristic of the period. An example from religious lyric is an image of the penitent Magdalen tossing away her pearls only to see them transformed into the tears of repentance welling up in her eyes.

Works

Lyrics set as madrigals
 Donna se voi m'odiate - set by Alfonso Ferrabosco
 Per non mi dir ch'io moia - set by Michelangelo Rossi

Bibliography 
 «Cesare Rinaldi bolognese». In : Le glorie de gli Incogniti: o vero, Gli huomini illustri dell'Accademia de' signori Incogniti di Venetia, In Venetia : appresso Francesco Valuasense stampator dell'Accademia, 1647, pp. 100–103 (on-line).

References

External links 
 

1559 births
1636 deaths
Baroque writers
16th-century Italian poets
17th-century Italian poets